Double X is the tenth album by the German hard rock band Bonfire. It was released in 2006 by BMG International. It celebrates 20 years of Bonfire music.

Track listing

Personnel 
Claus Lessmann - lead vocals, rhythm guitar
Hans Ziller - lead, rhythm & acoustic guitars
Chris Limburg - rhythm guitar
Uwe Köhler - bass
Jürgen Wiehler - drums, percussion

Reception
Metal Reviews said, "I'm very encouraged by this release. Although Bonfire don't completely go from the scrap heap to pulling a classic out of their pocket, Double X is solid comeback."

References

External links
 Billboard's Listing of Double X Album

Bonfire (band) albums
2006 albums